John Braman (1627–1703), of Chichester, Sussex, was an English politician.

He was a Member (MP) of the Parliament of England for Chichester in March 1679, October 1679 and 1681.

References

1627 births
1703 deaths
English MPs 1679
English MPs 1681
People from Chichester